Blastobasis rubiginosella is a moth in the  family Blastobasidae. It is found on the Canary Islands.

The wingspan is about 16 mm. The forewings have an ash-grey ground colour with reddish-brown markings. The hindwings are dark brown-grey.

References

Moths described in 1896
Blastobasis